Mount Wallace is one of the Tapley Mountains, 1,490 m, standing at the south side of the mouth of Roe Glacier at the juncture with Scott Glacier, in the Queen Maud Mountains. Mapped by United States Geological Survey (USGS) from surveys and U.S. Navy air photos, 1960–64. Named by Advisory Committee on Antarctic Names (US-ACAN) for J. Allen Wallace, Jr., meteorologist, South Pole Station winter party, 1960.

Mountains of the Ross Dependency
Gould Coast